Germanicus Julius Caesar (24 BC–19 AD) was a Roman general. Germanicus may also refer to:

People
 Germanicus of Smyrna (d. 155), Christian martyr
 Germanicus Kent (1791–1862), co-founder of Rockford, Illinois
 Germanicus Mantica (–1639), a Roman Catholic bishop
 Germanicus Mirault (1796–1879), a French surgeon
 Germanicus Young Tigner (1856–1938), American lawyer and judge

Other
 Germanicus (opera), a 1704 opera by Telemann
 Germanicus trilogy, an alternate-history book series by Kirk Mitchell
 Germanicus, Ontario, a community in Canada
 10208 Germanicus, an asteroid

See also

 
 Germanico (Handel), a 1708 opera
 Germanicopolis (disambiguation)
 Germanus (disambiguation)